Herpetosiphon giganteus is a species of bacteria in the genus Herpetosiphon known to produce 16 restriction enzymes.

H. giganteus has been studied for its gliding motility.

References

External links
 Restriction endonucleases from Herpetosiphon giganteus: an example of the evolution of DNA recognition specificity? P R Whitehead, D Jacobs, and N L Brown, Nucleic Acids Res. 1986 September 11; 14(17): 7031–7045.
Type strain of Herpetosiphon giganteus at BacDive -  the Bacterial Diversity Metadatabase

Phototrophic bacteria
Chloroflexota